The 1991 Southland Conference men's basketball tournament was held February 28–March 1 at Fant-Ewing Coliseum in Monroe, Louisiana.

Northeast Louisiana defeated  in the championship game, 87–60, to win their second Southland men's basketball tournament.

The Indians received a bid to the 1991 NCAA Tournament as the #15 seed in the Midwest region.

Format
Just four of the eight conference members participated in the tournament field. They were seeded based on regular season conference records, with tournament play beginning with the semifinal round.

Games in the quarterfinal round were played at the home court of the higher-seeded team. All remaining games were played at Fant-Ewing Coliseum in Monroe, Louisiana.

Bracket

References

Southland Conference men's basketball tournament
Tournament
Southland Conference men's basketball tournament
Southland Conference men's basketball tournament
Basketball competitions in Louisiana
Sports in Monroe, Louisiana
College sports tournaments in Louisiana